Jack Topping (born c. 2002) is an English chorister who came to public attention during 2013 for his solo vocal performances. Topping comes from Liverpool and is a member of the choir of Liverpool Metropolitan Cathedral. He released his debut studio album Wonderful World in November 2013.

Music career

2013: Wonderful World
In September 2013 he became the youngest person to be signed up by Decca Records, beating the record previously held by 12-year-old Isobel Suckling.  Decca's president Dickon Stainer described Topping as "the Gareth Bale of choristers". Topping's first EP Introducing Jack: The Classical EP was released on 18 October 2013 by Decca Records. On 29 November 2013 he released his first studio album Wonderful World, the album peaked at number 73 on the UK Albums Chart. On 13 December 2013, he released his first single, a cover version of the song "Tomorrow" from the musical Annie, the official campaign song for the charity Save the Children, for which Topping was appointed an ambassador.

The Paris Boys Choir, also known in France as Les Petits Chanteurs de Sainte-Croix de Neuilly, sang with Topping on this recording of a French song, "Caresse sur l'Océan".

Discography

Extended plays

Albums

Singles

References

External links
Official website

2000s births
Boy sopranos
English classical singers
English Roman Catholics
Musicians from Liverpool
Living people
21st-century English singers
21st-century British male singers